Mustafa Centre is a shopping mall in Singapore, situated on Syed Alwi Road in the cultural district of Little India, within the planning area of Kallang. Within a walking distance from Farrer Park station on the North East line, Mustafa Centre is a retail hub attracting many shoppers with its wide variety of products and services.

History
In 1971, Haji Mohamed Mustafa (19916-2001); his son, Mustaq Ahmad; and his cousin, Samsuddin, founded Mohamed Mustafa and Samsudin Co Pte Ltd (MMSCPL), and opened a retail store on Campbell Lane in Singapore.  It mainly sold ready-made clothing and later expanded to sale of electronic items. In 1985, they moved their business to the ground floor of Serangoon Plaza.

As their business expanded, they bought a shophouse on Syed Alwi Road. Subsequently, they bought the neighboring units and decided to build a new shopping mall to house their business. The business expanded internationally, to Chennai, in 2000.

On 2 April 2020, Mustafa Centre was identified as one of the many COVID-19 clusters, with over 100 cases among the foreign workers' dormitories being attributed to it. It closed and underwent a disinfection thereafter, and was reopened partially on 6 May 2020, after Singapore authorities eased its preventive measures to contain the spread of the virus. Since the reopening, operating hours were adjusted to 9.30am - 11.30pm daily due to high electricity costs and rental costs, previously it was operated 24 hours. On 27 August 2020, Mustaq announced cost-cutting measures which affected the salaries of some workers, and non-renewal of work permits of its foreign workers. The company had also worked with various unions and government entities to help redeploy its excess workers resulting from the pandemic to other companies, avoiding the necessity of a retrenchment exercise.

Facilities
Mustafa Centre houses the Mustafa department store, which caters mainly to the budget market. The department store consists of two shopping centres: one retailing jewelry and household appliances and functioning as a supermarket, and the other selling a variety of other products such as books, DVDs, watches, electronic goods, footwear, toys and clothing.

Mustafa Centre sells more than 300,000 items and provides many services such as foreign exchange and travel arrangements. In late 2011, Mustafa Centre opened a new rooftop restaurant named Kebabs ‘n Curries in its new wing. The restaurant serves a range of Asian dishes from 5 pm till 2 am daily.

See also
 List of shopping malls in Singapore

Notes

References

External links
 

Shopping malls in Singapore
Buildings and structures completed in 1995
Retail companies established in 1971
Kallang
Shopping malls established in 1995
1971 establishments in Singapore
Retail companies of Singapore
20th-century architecture in Singapore